Kongsvinger IL Toppfotball is a Norwegian football club from the town of Kongsvinger in Innlandet, founded in 1892. Its home ground is Gjemselund Stadion. It is part of sporting association, Kongsvinger IL.

Honours

Norwegian top flight
Runners-up (1): 1992
Third (2): 1986, 1987
Norwegian Cup
Finals (1): 2016
Semi-finals (5): 1983, 1990, 1992, 1996, 2016
UEFA Cup
2nd round against Juventus 1993

History
Despite limited financial resources, Kongsvinger played in the Norwegian top flight for 17 consecutive seasons between 1983 and 1999. Among the club's achievements were a silver medal in the league in 1992, bronze in both 1986 and 1987 and a 1–1 draw against football powerhouse Juventus in the 1993–94 UEFA Cup. Kongsvinger dropped out of the top flight in 1999, in the end struggling both financially and on the pitch. Only two years later another relegation sent the team down to 2. divisjon, the third tier in Norwegian football.

After a mediocre interlude in the 2002 season, former HamKam player Vegard Skogheim took over as head coach at Kongsvinger in 2003, instilling new enthusiasm into a young squad of part-timers. In 2003, the team went undefeated in their division and secured promotion back to the 1. divisjon, the second-highest level. The success continued in 2004, and the newly promoted team surprised many experts by managing third place in the league, and thereby earning the right to two play-off matches for promotion against the club that finished third last in the top division, Bodø/Glimt. Kongsvinger won the first match 1–0, but lost the second 0–4, giving away both the aggregate win and the right to play in the top division to Bodø/Glimt. Kongsvinger finished 1. divisjon as 3rd and qualified for promotion-relegation play-offs once again in the 2009 season. On 6 November, Kongsvinger defeated Sogndal 3–1 at home and faced with Sarpsborg 08. The club lost the first match 3–2 at away ground on 9 November, but won 3–1 at home  (5–4 aggregate) on 12 November and returned to Tippeligaen after 10 years absence. The team finished their comeback season in the top flight in 15th place and was relegated to the 1. divisjon for the 2011 season. The club was relegated to the 2. divisjon in 2013. In the 2015 season, Kongsvinger won their group in the 2. divisjon and won promotion to the second tier.

Season by season
{|class="wikitable"
|-bgcolor="#efefef"
! Season
!
! Pos.
! Pl.
! W
! D
! L
! GS
! GA
! P
!Cup
!Notes
|-
|2001
|1. divisjon
|align=right bgcolor="#FFCCCC"| 14
|align=right|30||align=right|8||align=right|5||align=right|17
|align=right|33||align=right|57||align=right|29
||Second round
|Relegated to 2. divisjon
|-
|2002
|2. divisjon
|align=right|7
|align=right|26||align=right|11||align=right|4||align=right|11
|align=right|36||align=right|31||align=right|37
||Second round
|
|-
|2003
|2. divisjon
|align=right bgcolor=#DDFFDD| 1
|align=right|26||align=right|22||align=right|4||align=right|0
|align=right|62||align=right|23||align=right|70
||Second round
|Promoted to 1. divisjon
|-
|2004
|1. divisjon
|align=right |3
|align=right|30||align=right|16||align=right|5||align=right|9
|align=right|53||align=right|42||align=right|53
||Fourth round
|Lost play-offs for promotion
|-
|2005
|1. divisjon
|align=right |10
|align=right|30||align=right|11||align=right|4||align=right|15
|align=right|41||align=right|48||align=right|37
||Second round
|
|-
|2006
|1. divisjon
|align=right |7
|align=right|30||align=right|11||align=right|10||align=right|9
|align=right|39||align=right|42||align=right|42
||Third round
|
|-
|2007
|1. divisjon
|align=right |4
|align=right|30||align=right|16||align=right|5||align=right|9
|align=right|56||align=right|42||align=right|53
||Third round
|
|-
|2008
|1. divisjon
|align=right |13
|align=right|30||align=right|8||align=right|6||align=right|16
|align=right|33||align=right|58||align=right|30
||Third round
|
|-
|2009
|1. divisjon
|align=right bgcolor=#DDFFDD| 3
|align=right|30||align=right|18||align=right|2||align=right|10
|align=right|52||align=right|37||align=right|56
||Third round
|Promoted to the Tippeligaen through play-offs
|-
|2010
|Tippeligaen
|align=right bgcolor="#FFCCCC"| 15
|align=right|30||align=right|4||align=right|8||align=right|18
|align=right|27||align=right|58||align=right|20
||Fourth round
||Relegated to the 1. divisjon
|-
|2011
|1. divisjon
|align=right |7
|align=right|30||align=right|14||align=right|7||align=right|9
|align=right|50||align=right|36||align=right|49
||Third round
|
|-
|2012
|1. divisjon
|align=right |9
|align=right|30||align=right|12||align=right|3||align=right|15
|align=right|44||align=right|48||align=right|39
||Third round
|
|-
|2013
|1. divisjon
|align=right bgcolor="#FFCCCC"| 14
|align=right|30||align=right|7||align=right|10||align=right|13
|align=right|37||align=right|54||align=right|31
||Third round
||Relegated to the 2. divisjon
|-
|2014
|2. divisjon
|align=right |4
|align=right|26||align=right|15||align=right|3||align=right|8
|align=right|61||align=right|42||align=right|48
||Third round
|
|-
|2015
|2. divisjon
|align=right bgcolor=#DDFFDD| 1
|align=right|26||align=right|20||align=right|2||align=right|4
|align=right|63||align=right|19||align=right|62
||Third round
|Promoted to 1. divisjon
|-
|2016 
|1. divisjon
|align=right |5
|align=right|30||align=right|14||align=right|7||align=right|9
|align=right|56||align=right|42||align=right|49
|bgcolor=Silver|Final
|
|-
|2017 
|1. divisjon
|align=right |10
|align=right|30||align=right|10||align=right|6||align=right|14
|align=right|47||align=right|46||align=right|36
||Third round
|
|-
|2018
|1. divisjon
|align=right |8
|align=right|30||align=right|12||align=right|6||align=right|12
|align=right|59||align=right|49||align=right|42
||Third round
|
|-
|2019 
|1. divisjon
|align=right |5
|align=right|30||align=right|14||align=right|4||align=right|12
|align=right|37||align=right|36||align=right|46
||Fourth round
|
|-
|2020 
|1. divisjon
|align=right bgcolor="#FFCCCC"| 15
|align=right|30||align=right|6||align=right|10||align=right|14
|align=right|35||align=right|53||align=right|28
||Cancelled
|Relegated to the 2. divisjon
|-
|2021 
|2. divisjon
|align=right bgcolor=#DDFFDD| 1
|align=right|26||align=right|22||align=right|2||align=right|2
|align=right|88||align=right|26||align=right|68
||Fourth round
|Promoted to the 1. divisjon
|-
|2022
|1. divisjon
|align=right |6
|align=right|30||align=right|13||align=right|7||align=right|10
|align=right|43||align=right|37||align=right|46
||Second round
|
|}
Source:

European record

Current squad

Managerial history

Christer Nilsson (1983)
Svein Ivar Sigernes (1984–1985)
Ingvar Stadheim (1986)
Even Pellerud (1987–89)
Kent Karlsson (1990)
Svein Ivar Sigernes (1991)
Per Brogeland (1992–95)
Åge Steen (1996–97)
Per Anders Sjøvold (1998)
Per Brogeland (1998–99)
Hans Knutsen (2000)
Erik Nystuen (2001)
Kenneth Rosén (2002)
Vegard Skogheim (2003–06)
Thomas Berntsen (2006–08)
Tom Nordlie (2008–09)

Øyvind Eide (2009)
Trond Amundsen (2009–10)
Tony Gustavsson (2010)
Per Brogeland (2011)
Tom Nordlie (2011–2012)
Stian Aasen (2013–2014)
André Bergdølmo (2014) 
Luis Berkemeier Pimenta (2015–2016)
Hans-Erik Eriksen (2017–2018)
Mark Dempsey (2018) 
Vítor Gazimba (2019)
Mika Lehkosuo (2019–2020)
Espen Nystuen (interim) (2020)
Eirik Mæland (2021–2022)
Vegard Hansen (2022–)

Statistics
Most matches played for the club: Øivind Tomteberget: 660
Most league goals scored for the club: Cato Holtet: 46
Biggest win: 6–0 vs Start (h 1985) Djerv 1919 (h 1989) and Fyllingen (h 1993)
Biggest loss: 0–8 vs Tromsø (a 1995) and Strømsgodset (a 1997)
Most spectators at a home match: 10213 (KIL-Juventus 1993, played at Ullevaal Stadion)
Most spectators at a home match at Gjemselund Stadion: 6794 (KIL-Vålerenga 1983)

References

External links
 

 
Eliteserien clubs
Association football clubs established in 1892
1892 establishments in Norway
Sport in Hedmark